In photography, shutter lag is the delay between triggering the shutter and when the photograph is actually recorded. This is a common problem in the photography of fast-moving objects or animals and people in motion. The term narrowly refers only to shutter effects, but more broadly refers to all lag between when the shutter button is pressed and when the photo is taken, including metering and focus lag.

Film cameras 
In film cameras, the delay is caused by the mechanism inside the camera that opens the shutter, exposing the film. Because the process is mechanical, however, and relatively brief, shutter lag in film cameras is often only noticeable (and of any concern) to professionals. SLRs have slightly longer shutter lag than rangefinders, because of the need to lift the mirror. Point-and-shoot film cameras often have significant shutter lag.

Digital cameras 
Shutter lag is much more of a problem with digital cameras. Here, the delay results from the charging of the charge-coupled device (CCD) image sensor and relatively slow transmission of its capture data to the circuitry of the camera for processing and storage.

The comet-tail artifact that early CCD sensors suffered from was significantly reduced by the invention of the pinned photodiode (PPD). It was invented by Nobukazu Teranishi, Hiromitsu Shiraki and Yasuo Ishihara at NEC in 1980. The "pinned photodiode" is a photodetector structure used in almost all charge-coupled device (CCD) and CMOS image sensors (CIS) due to its low noise, high quantum efficiency and low dark current. In 1987, the PPD began to be incorporated into most CCD devices, becoming a fixture in consumer electronic video cameras and then digital still cameras. The PPD has since been used in most CCD sensors and then CMOS sensors.

Improvements in technology, such as the speed, bandwidth and power consumption of processor chips and memory, as well as CCD technology and then CMOS sensors, have made shutter lag less of a problem. While digital SLRs have achieved lag times around 50 ms by the late 2000s, some EVILs take half as long in the 2010s. That said, the lag times of some exceptional historic devices is still unsurpassed, see table below.

AE & AF lag 
However, what many people consider shutter lag is in fact the time the camera takes to meter (set the exposure) and auto-focus, which is lag of a different cause but similar effect.

These causes of lag can be eliminated by pre-setting exposure and focus. One can either manually set exposure and focus, or use automatic exposure and autofocus, then fixing the settings so they do not change; this can often be done by holding the shutter release halfway down, or by using a separate "AE / AF lock" button (useful if taking multiple photographs that are not in a burst), and means the subsequent photographs will be taken faster. These techniques can be combined – one can manually set the exposure and then use AF lock or conversely.

Examples of various shutter lag times 
Note that cameras offer increasingly varied choices of fully mechanical shutter, first-courtain electronic shutter (EFCS; meaning a mechanical shutter only at the end of the exposure), or fully electronic (thus silent) shutter. This is paired with either autofocus, fully manual focus, or prefocus (half-pressing the shutter button to engage autofocus and lock exposure; then holding the button half-pressed until the decisive picture-taking moment, in which the button is depressed completely). Typically, prefocus + EFCS results in the shortest shutter lag (see the following individual sources with measurements for all available modi). 

This table quotes the shortest possible lag time of the respective camera. Note that variations may occur between manufacturer-claimed times and real-world measurements. In the case of follow-up versions of cameras (Mark II, -N, -s, ...), it is usually save to assume identical performance unless explicitly stated otherwise in press releases or comparisons.

References

External links 
 Shutter lag comparison chart for digital P&S
 Imaging Resource camera reviews often with measured shutter lag times
 NY Times article on shutter lag
 Photographer's Article on Shutter Lag
 What is Zero Shutter Delay (ZSD) on your mobile camera
Photography equipment